Telok Blangah is a subzone region and housing estate located in the area behind Keppel Harbour in Bukit Merah, Singapore. Teluk Blanga is the district between Pasir Panjang and Tanjong Pagar.

Name
The region is named after the bay. Telok Blangah (Jawi: تلوق بلڠه) is a Malay compound of blanga "a type of cooking pot" and telok "bay" and so literally means "cooking pot bay", so named on account of its shape.

In the olden maps, Telok Blangah's name spelling was written as Teluk Blanga, Teluk Belanga and Teluk Blangah.

Teluk Blanga is known as sit lat mng in Hokkien, meaning "Singapore gate" or "north west gate".

History
Historically, this area is as old as the thirteenth century city of Temasek. The area is rich with Malay aristocratic history of past royal events. According to the Malay Annals, Sang Nila Utama's boat ran into a storm and he threw everything overboard, including his crown before landing just off Telok Blangah beach.

The area gained prominence again during the British period when Sir Stamford Raffles in 1823 assigned Temenggong Abdul Rahman (died 1825) and his followers  of land for their residence and a cemetery. The area flourished under Temenggong Abdul Rahman because of his monopoly over the gutta percha trade.

Temenggong Abdul Rahman's eldest son, Tun Haji Abdullah, informally took over as Temenggong of Johor after his death in 1825, followed by his second son Daeng Ibrahim informally in 1833 and officially on 19 August 1841.

In 1845, Telok Blangah Hill (Malay: Bukit Telok Blangah) was renamed to Mount Faber after Captain Charles Edward Faber.

Following Temenggong Daeng Ibrahim’s death in 1862, his first son Temenggong Abu Bakar succeed him and moved his Istana to Tyersall. In 1885, when Maharaja Abu Bakar became the Sultan of Johor, he moved to Johor Bahru.

The former royal audience hall (now a mosque, Masjid Temenggong Daeng Ibrahim) and the Johor Royal Mausoleum still remain today at Telok Blangah Road, near VivoCity and Sentosa Gateway. The last to be buried was Ungku Modh. Khalif (or Khalid), the younger brother of Sultan Abu Bakar in 1900.

Another Malay royal cemetery and shrine nearby is Keramat Bukit Kasita at Bukit Purmei, which is the final resting place of the Riau-Lingga Royal Family, a split of the Johor Royal Family.

Telok Blangah Road was officially named in 1907. The sacred shrine of Puteri Raden Mas Ayu, a sixteenth-century Javanese princess, is located at Mount Faber Road, near the junction with Telok Blangah Road.

Other Landmarks
There are several century-old Chinese temples constructed to meet the spiritual and social needs of the Chinese immigrants who settled in the area around Telok Blangah in the late 1800s. Ban Siew San Kuan Imm Tong (萬壽山觀音堂) and Koon Seng Ting (堃成堂) were built in 1880 and managed to weather through more than 100 years at the same location. Both temples were proposed for conservation under the Draft Master Plan 2013 by Urban Redevelopment Authority. Another prominent old temple in the area will be Telok Blangah Ting Kong Beo (直落布蘭雅天公廟) which was built in 1923 or earlier.

References

Victor R Savage, Brenda S A Yeoh (2003), Toponymics - A Study of Singapore Street Names, Eastern Universities Press, 

 
Places in Singapore
Bukit Merah